Maimu Berg (born August 27, 1945 in Tallinn) is an Estonian writer, critic, translator, and journalist. She was a member of the Riigikogu, elected in 2011.

Berg graduated from secondary school in Tallinn in 1968, and took her degree in Estonian language and literature from the University of Tartu. She worked in the university library from 1969 to 1974, and edited the magazine Siluett from 1974 to 1990.  She also worked as a journalist for various publications. She was a member of the People's Union of Estonia from 2002 to 2006, whereupon she became a member of the Social Democratic Party. She served on the Tallinn City Council from 2007 to 2009. She was nominated to stand for Parliament in 2003 and 2007, and for the European Parliament in 2004. Berg was married for a time to the writer Vaino Vahing, by whom she had a daughter, the judge Julia Laffranque.

She has written novels and short stories.

Controversy over sexual child abuse by a member of Estonian Writer's Union in 2020 
In a 2020 discussion over the membership of Peeter Helme, who was convicted of sexually luring a child by the first instance in the Estonian court system, in the Estonian Writer's Union, Maimu Berg opposed the expulsion of Peeter Helme.

References

This article is a translation of the corresponding article on the Estonian Wikipedia.

External links
 Maimu Berg at Estonian Writers' Online Dictionary

1945 births
Living people
Estonian women novelists
Estonian women journalists
Estonian women short story writers
20th-century Estonian novelists
20th-century Estonian women writers
21st-century Estonian novelists
21st-century Estonian women writers
20th-century Estonian politicians
University of Tartu alumni
Members of the Riigikogu, 2011–2015
People's Union of Estonia politicians
Social Democratic Party (Estonia) politicians
Writers from Tallinn
Politicians from Tallinn
Estonian city councillors
Estonian translators
20th-century translators
21st-century translators
20th-century short story writers
21st-century short story writers
Women members of the Riigikogu
Recipients of the Order of the White Star, 5th Class
21st-century Estonian women politicians